Ancylolomia irrorata is a moth in the family Crambidae. It was described by George Hampson in 1919. It is found in Nigeria.

References

Endemic fauna of Nigeria
Ancylolomia
Moths described in 1919
Moths of Africa